"Reunion" was an American television play broadcast live from CBS Television City in Hollywood on January 2, 1958, as part of the second season of the CBS television series Playhouse 90. Merle Miller wrote the teleplay based on his novel of the same name. Allan Reisner directed. Hugh O'Brian, Martha Hyer, Dane Clark, and Charles Drake starred.

Plot
A New York lawyer, James Merrick, organizes a reunion for his World War II comrades. Each tells a life secret. The reunion becomes a test of the relationship between Merrick and his wife.

Cast
The following performers received screen credit for their performances:

 Hugh O'Brian - Jason Merrick
 Martha Hyer - Louise Merrick
 Dane Clark - Saul Leventhal
 Charles Drake - Guy Schmitt
 Jack Lord - Homer Aswell
 Neva Patterson - Elizabeth Murray
 Patricia Barry - Lucille
 Frances Farmer - Val Schmitt
 Robert Paget - Bell Boy

References

1958 television plays
1958 American television episodes
Playhouse 90 (season 2) episodes